Sarab Sorkheh Sadeqabad (also Romanized as Sarāb Sorkheh Şādeqābād; also known as Sarāb-e Sorkheh) is a village in Qaleh-ye Mozaffari Rural District, in the Central District of Selseleh County, Lorestan Province, Iran. At the 2006 census, its population was 57, in 13 families.

References 

Towns and villages in Selseleh County